The Realms of Gold is a 1975 novel by British novelist Margaret Drabble. The novel explores the mid-life experiences of anthropologist Frances Wingate and her affair with Karel Schmidt.

Development
Drabble describes the initial inspiration for the novel in an interview in The Paris Review:

Style
The novel is primarily a reflection on Wingate's life, but critic Broyard, describes the novels best features are "Brilliant little essays" about life and life issues.

Critical reception
Reception of the novel was mixed. New York Times reviewer Anatole Broyard described the novel as "drenched with intelligence, that is not enough to make it work." Broyard compared Drabble's poor work to the poor subsequent novels by Edna O'Brien and Gail Godwin. Kirkus review was much more positive about the novel, calling it "a conspicuous pleasure to read--a cheerful reconciliation of the exactions of the past and the possibilities that lie just ahead."

Further reading

References

1975 British novels
Novels by Margaret Drabble
Novels set in fictional countries
Weidenfeld & Nicolson books